The diocese of Thai Binh is a Roman Catholic diocese in northern Vietnam. The bishop is François Xavier Nguyên Van Sang, since 1990. On July 25, 2009, Pope Benedict XVI selected Monsignor Pierre Nguyen Van De to be bishop upon Nguyên Van Sang's retirement.

The creation of the diocese in present form was declared November 24, 1960.

The diocese covers an area of 2,200 km², and is a suffragan diocese of the Archdiocese of Hanoi.

By 2004, the diocese of Thai Binh had about 116,399 believers (4.1% of the population), 42 priests and 64 parishes.

Sacred Heart Cathedral in Thai Binh town has been assigned as the Cathedral of the diocese.

In May, 2008, the authorities returned the two-building compound of build in 1936 My Duc seminary to the diocese. The seminary, which now bears the name of the Sacred Heart, provides education for 33 Roman Catholic students.

References

Thái Bình province
Thai Binh
Christian organizations established in 1960
Roman Catholic dioceses and prelatures established in the 20th century
Thai Binh, Roman Catholic Diocese of
1960 establishments in North Vietnam